Claude Lacroix (1944 – 2 March 2021) was a French comic book author and screenwriter.

Biography

As a cartoonist and writer, Lacroix published comics such as Les Pieds Nickelés in newspapers like .

Claude Lacroix died of complications from a brain degeneration on 2 March 2021 at the age of 77.

WorksLes Aventures des Gammas (1975–1976)Yann le migrateur (1978–1984)L'homme au chapeau mou (1979–1982)Fariboles sidérales (1979)(1993–2014)Des Monuments & des Hommes'' (2006)

References

1944 births
2021 deaths
French comics writers
French cartoonists
French screenwriters